Biggins is a surname of English origin. People with the name include:

Bob Biggins (born 1946), American politician from Illinois
Brian Biggins (1940–2006), English football player
Christopher Biggins (born 1948), English actor and television personality
Francis Joseph Biggins (1884–1962), English football player
Jonathan Biggins (born 1960), Australian actor, singer, writer, and comedian
Steve Biggins (born 1954), English football player and coach
Wayne Biggins (born 1961), English football player

English-language surnames